Charles Edward Saunders  (13 September 1902 – 1 September 1994) was a New Zealand rower who competed at the 1930 British Empire Games, winning two medals, and at the 1932 Summer Olympics.

Early life and family
Born in Blenheim on 13 September 1902, Saunders was the youngest son of George Frederick Saunders and Elizabeth Saunders (née Lawrance). On 6 May 1935, he married Merle Moore at St Andrew's Church, Blenheim, and the couple went on to have three children.

Rowing
A member of the Wairau Rowing Club, Saunders represented New Zealand at the 1930 British Empire Games in Hamilton, Ontario. He was a member of the men's eight that won the silver medal, and the men's coxless four that won the bronze medal.

At the 1932 Summer Olympics, he was part of the New Zealand men's coxed four that finished fourth in the final.

Later life and death
In the 1975 Queen's Birthday Honours, Saunders was appointed a Member of the Order of the British Empire, for services to rowing and the community. He died on 1 September 1994,  and his ashes were buried at Omaka Cemetery, Blenheim.

References

External links
 
 

1902 births
1994 deaths
Sportspeople from Blenheim, New Zealand
New Zealand male rowers
Olympic rowers of New Zealand
Rowers at the 1932 Summer Olympics
Rowers at the 1930 British Empire Games
Commonwealth Games silver medallists for New Zealand
Commonwealth Games bronze medallists for New Zealand
New Zealand Members of the Order of the British Empire
Commonwealth Games medallists in rowing
Burials at Omaka Cemetery
New Zealand justices of the peace
Medallists at the 1930 British Empire Games